Sisab (also Romanized as Sīsāb) is a village in Garmkhan Rural District, Garmkhan District, Bojnord County, North Khorasan Province, Iran. At the 2006 census, its population was 572, in 142 families.

References 

Populated places in Bojnord County